Carlos Pereyra School (Escuela Carlos Pereyra) is a private Catholic basic education institution run by the Society of Jesus  in La Laguna region of Torreon, Coahuila, Mexico. It was founded by the Jesuits in 1942 and offers grades from preschool through high school.

History
The members of the National Union of Catholic Students (UNEC) with the assistance of Leobardo Fernández launched the school in 1942. It was affiliated with the National Autonomous University of Mexico (UNAM) and named after Carlos Pereyra a historian and diplomat, and native of Saltillo, Coahuila. High school classes began in law and social sciences, in physics and chemistry, and in physics and mathematics.

Campus
The Carlos Pereyra School has a 15 hectare campus in the northern part of the city of Torreon, near the Iberoamerican University Torreón, a jesuit university.
The campus has a chapel, a gymnasium-auditorium (Gimnasio-Auditorio Loyola), three auditoriums, physics and chemistry labs, computer labs, a general library (Biblioteca San Luis Gonzaga), a children's library, soccer fields, basketball and voleiball courts and a 400 meter track.

Rectors

See also
 List of Jesuit sites

References

Private schools in Mexico
Educational institutions established in 1942
Jesuit schools in Mexico
1942 establishments in Mexico